The 2013 Yas Marina GP2 Series round was a GP2 Series motor race held on November 2 and 3, 2013 at Yas Marina Circuit, Abu Dhabi. It was the final showdown  of the 2013 GP2 Series. The race supported the 2013 Abu Dhabi Grand Prix.

Classification

Qualifying

Feature race

Sprint race

See also 
 2013 Abu Dhabi Grand Prix
 2013 Yas Marina GP3 Series round

References

Yas Marina
GP2
Yas Marina